Barbara Mandrell & the Mandrell Sisters was an American variety show starring American country artist Barbara Mandrell, along with her sisters Irlene Mandrell and Louise Mandrell. The show ran for two seasons on the NBC network between November 1980 and June 1982. The program mixed both music and comedy sketches. The siblings often engaged in sketches involving their family relationship. The music of the show featured the sisters singing and playing a variety of musical instruments. Guest performers were also a part of every show. The show ended its run after Mandrell decided to step away due to the constant workload.

Background
Barbara Mandrell was considered by writers to be one of country music's most successful music artists during the late 1970s and early 1980s. She had a series of number one and top ten country singles, many of which crossed over onto the pop charts. During this period, Mandrell also became known for her high production concert shows that often included costume changes and choreography. Her performance style attracted the attention of NBC producer Marty Krofft, who offered Mandrell her own television show. She originally turned down his offer. "My father was in agreement with me, I would never do a network television show. We thought that was sudden death to a recording artist," she later told The Tennessean. However, she ultimately accepted the role after multiple offers.

Format
The program was hosted by Barbara Mandrell, along with her younger sisters Irlene and Louise. It was co-produced by Sid and Marty Krofft, along with Ernest Chambers and Frank Peppiatt. It was directed by Bob Henry and Jack Regas. Music for the variety show was arranged by the Dennis McCarthy Orchestra and Mandrell's touring band The Do Rites. It ran on the NBC network weekly for a total of 60 minutes for two seasons. A total of 36 episodes were aired. The show was filmed at a studio in Los Angeles, California. The show originally aired on Tuesday nights on the NBC network but was adjusted to Saturday nights until February 1982. That year, the show was moved back to the network's Tuesday night lineup before being moved back to Saturday nights for the final two months of its run.

Barbara Mandrell & the Mandrell Sisters mixed both music and comedy sketches. The comedy sketches were often built around the relationship of the Mandrell sisters. The siblings were described as "engaging in a certain amount of tongue-in-cheek sibling rivalry", according to writers Tim Brooks and Earle Marsh. The also observed that Barbara was portrayed as the "serious, pushy sister", while Irlene was portrayed as "the sexy, vain one". The show also centered around music.

The program often showcased the sisters' musician skills on multiple instruments. Barbara was often seen playing the banjo, steel guitar, piano and saxophone. Sister Louise was shown playing the banjo and fiddle. Irlene was routinely featured playing the drums. The show also included guests performers that ranged in style and genre. Among their featured guests were Ray Charles, Bob Hope, and Glen Campbell. The program often ended with a traditional medley of gospel music.

Cancellation
Although the show was planning to continue on the NBC network, Mandrell chose to leave the program after only two seasons. The demand of keeping both a singing and television career drove Mandrell towards exhaustion. "The one and only reason I will not is because I was under severe strain in my throat ... The hours -- some days 14 and some days 16 -- were unbelievable," she explained in 1982. The strain of Mandrell's voice prompted her to take shots cortisone so she could tape the program. Doctors convinced her to quit, stating that it would cause permanent vocal damage. At the time of the show's cancellation, the program was said to have attracted 40 million viewers.

In 2007, the show was offered in a DVD format and was sold under the title Best of Barbara Mandrell and the Mandrell Sisters Show.

Nielsen ratings/broadcast schedule

Guest stars
Guest stars are adapted from the credits of the DVD the Best of Barbara & the Mandrell Sisters.

 Alabama
 Hoyt Axton
 Paul Anka
 R.C. Bannon
 Glen Campbell
 June Carter Cash
 Johnny Cash
 Ray Charles
 Gail Davies
 Phyllis Diller
 Tennessee Ernie Ford
 Dale Evans
 Andy Gibb
 Terri Gibbs
 Bobby Goldsboro
 Bob Hope
 Tom Jones
 Gladys Knight & the Pips
 Brenda Lee
 The Oak Ridge Boys
 Donny Osmond
 Dolly Parton
 Minnie Pearl
 Charley Pride
 Debbie Reynolds
 Marty Robbins
 Kenny Rogers
 Roy Rogers
 Jim Stafford
 Sha-Na-Na
 Ray Stevens
 John Schneider
 The Statler Brothers
 Sylvia
 Fran Tarkenton
 Mel Tillis
 B.J. Thomas
 Conway Twitty
 Bobby Vinton
 Dottie West
 Andy Williams

References

1980 American television series debuts
1982 American television series endings
1980s American musical comedy television series
1980s American sketch comedy television series
1980s American variety television series
Country music television series
NBC original programming
English-language television shows